Niaguis Arrondissement  is an arrondissement of the Ziguinchor Department in the Ziguinchor Region of Senegal.

Subdivisions
The arrondissement is divided administratively into 3 rural communities (communautés rurales) and in turn into villages.

Communautés rurales :

Arrondissements of Senegal
Ziguinchor Region
Populated places in the Ziguinchor Department